Antonin-Fernand Drapier (28 April 1891 – 30 July 1967) was a French prelate of the Catholic Church who worked in the diplomatic service of the Holy See.

He was born on 28 April 1891 in Creuë-en-Woëvre, France. He was ordained priest of the Dominican Order on 24 April 1924.

He was named titular archbishop of Neocesarea di Ponto and Apostolic Delegate to Mesopotamia, Kurdistan, and Lesser Armenia on 7 October 1929. He received his episcopal consecration on 22 December 1929 from François David, Bishop of the Chaldean Catholic Eparchy of Amadiya.

He was appointed Apostolic Delegate to Indochina on 28 November 1936. 

He retired in 1950 and died on 30 July 1967.

References

1891 births
1967 deaths
Participants in the Second Vatican Council
20th-century Roman Catholic titular archbishops
French Dominicans
Dominican bishops
Apostolic Nuncios to Iraq
People from Meuse (department)